The Hong Kong Go Association (abbreviated as HKGA), created in 1982, is an organizational member of the International Go Federation, whose current chairman is 張大朋 (Pinyin: Zhāng Dà Péng). It is dedicated to training and ranking Go players in Hong Kong.

Activity Background
The Go player population in Hong Kong is not high as mainland China or Japan, but it is considered that Go is one of the most popular games in Hong Kong due to the following reasons:
 Hong Kong has hosted the World Youth Go Championship in 1987.
 Hong Kong has been sending representative players to international tournaments such as the World Amateur Go Championship every year (some Hong Kong players have ranked in to 2nd or 3rd place). 

The Go players in Hong Kong have increased and getting stronger since the establishment of the HKGA, and it is recognized that HKGA has somewhat contributed to these advancements.

See also 

 International Go Federation
 List of professional Go tournaments
 Zhongguo Qiyuan
 Taiwan Chi Yuan
 Singapore Weiqi Association

References

External links
 Website of Hong Kong Go Association
 HKGA Facebook Page
 Source: Pinyin translated with CozyChinese.COM

Go organizations